Wait list, in university and college admissions, is a term used in the United States and other countries to describe a situation in which a college or university has not formally accepted a particular student for admission, but at the same time may offer admission in the next few months if spaces become available. It is a contingent offer only, and may mean an offer of admission in the future, or it may not, depending on circumstances. It has been described as a type of college admissions "purgatory", or being held in "the higher-ed equivalent of limbo". The percent of applicants offered admission, who decide to accept, is known as the admissions yield, and this proportion varies somewhat from year to year, and reflects economic conditions as well as interest in a given university.

Colleges mailing out wait list offers generally advise students to reserve a spot at a college they have been accepted to by sending in a deposit, usually several hundred dollars to guarantee that the student will have a place at any college in the fall. Later, if a student is accepted by a college from a wait list, and if he or she chooses to accept the wait list offer, it usually entails sacrificing that earlier deposit. In the United States, for students applying by regular admission, the month of April is a time when much activity happens; colleges email offers of acceptance and rejection, and students select a college by sending a deposit. In May, after receiving deposits, colleges know how many spots will be open, and will usually begin to offer admission to students on their wait lists as positions become open. Students can be offered admission from the wait list during May and June and throughout the summer.

According to several reports, colleges and universities use wait lists to try to hedge their guesses about how many students will ultimately decide to accept their offers of admission in any given academic year, with the idea being to build "a reservoir of qualified students to draw from to replace successful applicants who choose to go elsewhere." If fewer students say yes, then colleges will often go to their wait lists to try to find replacements. In 2010, according to one source, roughly 10% of college applicants were put on a wait list.

Wait lists tend to be used by elite and selective universities as well as second-tier liberal arts colleges who are uncertain about how many students will show up in the fall; for example, Stanford and Yale put 1,000 students on their wait lists and Duke put 3,000 on their wait list, according to one report in 2010. Amherst takes 35 students from the 1,000 students on its wait list. And as a general rule, selective colleges and universities will usually have some form of wait list. Of the students on a wait list at a highly selective school, a fraction may be offered admission before classes begin in late August or September. One report said the fraction of wait-listed students who were eventually offered admission––as an average of all students wait listed in a given year––was 30%, but this is an overall average, and the fraction of wait-listed applicants to prestigious universities, who are eventually admitted, is much less. Students who are wait-listed can take steps to improve their chances of admission from a wait list by writing letters of interest and by sending second-semester senior grades. Wait listed students are ranked by the admissions department in terms of overall desirability, based on the college's estimation of admissions criteria, and more highly ranked waitlisted students are offered admission first when spots open; this ranking is not revealed to the public.

Yields and wait list acceptances

Note: the yield is the percent of students offered admission who commit to enrolling.
Note: Wait list acceptances are the number of wait-listed applicants who were eventually offered admission, and accepted the offer.
Source for data: Jacques Steinberg of The New York Times, May 2010

See also
 College admissions in the United States
 Transfer admissions in the United States

References

University and college admissions